The emerald rockcod  (Trematomus bernacchii), also known as the emerald notothen is a species of marine ray-finned fish belonging to the family Nototheniidae, the notothens or cod icefishes. It is native to the Southern Ocean where it is a commercially important species.

Taxonomy 
The Emerald rockcod was first formally described in 1902 by the Belgian-born British ichthyologist George Albert Boulenger with the type localities given as Cape Adare in Antarctica at a depth of 5-8 fathoms and Duke of York Island at a depth of 3-4 fathoms. In 1982 the Russian ichthyologist Arkady Vladimirovich Balushkin placed this species, and all the other species in its genus bar the type species, T. newnesi, in the new genus Pseudotrematomus but this has not been widely accepted. The specific name honours the Australian  Australian physicist and astronomer Louis Bernacchi who carried out much of the exploring and collecting of specimens during the Southern Cross Expedition, on which the type was collected.

Description
This species is mostly brown in color with darker spots. The first dorsal fin contains 4-6 spines, the second dorsal fin has 34-39 soft rays and the anal fin has 31-35 soft rays. The maximum reported age for this species is 10 years.

Distribution, habitat, and habits
It is adapted to living in waters of extremely low temperature (-1.86 °C mean temperature in McMurdo Sound). It consumes various invertebrates and small fishes and also is known to feed on some algae. Their foraging techniques make them the primary predators of the medium-sized population of the Antarctic scallop, Adamussium colbecki.

Physiological adaptations for cold 
Unlike most organisms, the emerald rockcod does not show a typical heat shock response; for example, it does not upregulate the heat shock protein gene hsp70 when in warm temperatures. Instead, upregulation of hsp70 is more prominent when it is in its normal temperature environment.  Although normally hsp70 is an inducible gene, this gene was found to be expressed at all times in emerald rockcod. A constitutive heat shock gene hsc71 showed the same pattern of expression, and so it was deduced that in the emerald rockcod hsp70 was also being expressed as a constitutive gene. Low temperatures in its Antarctic habitat may cause cellular stress that can denature the cellular proteins of these fish, making it necessary to express high constitutive levels of heat shock proteins.

References

emerald rockcod
Fish of the Southern Ocean
Fish of Antarctica
emerald rockcod
Taxa named by George Albert Boulenger